Telephone numbers in Norway have the country code "+47" and up to the first 2 digits of the phone number will indicate its geographic area. Emergency services are 3 digits long and start with the number "1". Mobile numbers vary in length, either 8 digits or 12 digits.

Historical numbering plan pre-1992

Before 1992, telephone numbers would consist of a 2 or 3-digit area code, and a 5 or 6-digit subscriber number. Example: (067) 85 000 and (04) 66 00 00.
 
In that year, a closed telephone numbering plan was adopted, with eight-digit telephone numbers incorporating the area code and full number dialling for local and national calls. Service numbers were to be three digits long, Directory numbers four digits and some companies were allocated five-digit numbers, ex. 07575.
GSM telephony was introduced in 1993, and those numbers always start with the digits '4' or '9'.

Emergency numbers

Historically, the local operator would take emergency calls and forward them to the police, fire or local doctor. In 1964, the emergency number 000 was introduced. In 1985, a modernized emergency service was started at Haukeland hospital in Bergen for Hordaland. In 1986, the emergency numbers changed to 001 for fire brigade, 002 for police and 003 for ambulance. These numbers changed to 110, 112 and 113 in 1994, when the international access code changed from 095 to 00.

Landline numbers (as of 2020)
Geographic numbers were abolished in January 2020. Landlines will be shut down in 2023 by Telenor. Caller IDs will no longer say the region, but rather say "Norway" or leave blank instead. These numbers are today used by VOIP services.
 2x xx xx xx - 3x xx xx xx
50 xx xx xx -  57 xx xx xx 
6x xx xx xx - 7x xx xx xx

Non-geographic numbers
8xx xx xxx: Non-geographical numbers (toll-free, voicemail, premium-numbers, television shows, etc.)
0xxxx: Non-geographical numbers (land-line rate). Common with e.g. taxi companies and commercial services. Dialled from outside Norway as +47 0xxxx
xxxx: Used in SMS, mostly used for campaigns and bot messages. You can't reply back in most of these numbers. They also cost money to send. They are very often cheap if in Norway, sometimes free.

Mobile numbers
9x xx xx xx (Previously formatted as 9xx xx xxx)
40991: Mobile numbers (older)
4x xx xx xx: Mobile numbers (newer). (Previously formatted as 4xx xx xxx)
58 xx xx xx xx xx: Mobile numbers (M2M traffic)
59 xx xx xx: Mobile numbers (newer, M2M traffic)

Emergency
110: Fire brigade
112: Police
113: Ambulance
116 123: Mental Health help lifeline. Also the Norwegian Equivalent of National Suicide Prevention Lifeline / 988 Suicide & Crisis Lifeline.

Special numbers
00: International prefix, plus (+) is more common today 
01: Reserved for future changes 
02xxx to 09xxx: 5-digit non-geographical numbers (these numbers are mostly equivalent to 815 non-geographical numbers, and can be acquired by any company or organization given availability and a fee of between NOK 3,300 and NOK 125,000 per year)
100-189: Standardized special numbers (emergency numbers, road and public transport information, etc.)
19x: Operator-specific special numbers 
1850 to 1899: Directory services
116xxx: Harmonised services of social value

References

Sources
 Nummerplan: E.164, www.nkom.no. Retrieved 29 November 2022.
 Ansatte, jan.mayen.no. Retrieved 25 January 2017.

External links
 Numberplan: E.164, a complete plan from the Norwegian Post and Telecommunications Authority

Norway
Telephone numbers
Telephone numbers